A History of English Food is a history of English cuisine from the Middle Ages to the end of the twentieth century written by the celebrity cook Clarissa Dickson Wright. Each era is treated in turn with a chapter. The text combines history, recipes, and anecdotes, and is illustrated with 32 pages of colour plates.

The book was marked as a future classic by The Independent; it was welcomed by critics from The Telegraph and The Spectator, but disliked by the critic in The Guardian.

Book

Approach

The book is divided into 15 chapters, forming a strict chronological sequence of periods such as "the Georgian age". The chapters freely combine outlines of the historical context, descriptions of recipes, stories about significant figures, and personal anecdotes. For example, "The Medieval Larder" has an extensive section on the "medieval pig" (page 22ff), leading into a description of Dickson Wright's own childhood memories of helping to kill her father's pigs and making black pudding, chitterlings and sausages, as well as having hams and bacon smoked. To this is added her personal opinion; thus, the medieval chapter ends "The battles of Crécy and Agincourt would scarcely have been won had they been fought by soldiers from a destitute nation." (page 41)

Each chapter is opened with a monochrome illustration from its period, with a detailed caption.

There are 32 pages of colour plates illustrating famous cookery writers such as Robert May and stages of English cuisine such as "The 1950s kitchen".

Contents

Page numbers refer to the first English edition.

 1 Bacon and new-laid eggs: the medieval larder 1
 2 Eastern spices and baked venison: the high middle ages 43
 3 Marzipan and new world turkeys: the Tudor kitchen 77
 4 Orange carrots and white bread: England in the age of Gloriana 117
 5 Preserved quince and my Lord of Devonshire's pudding: the Elizabethan year 149
 6 Double cream and pastry galleons: the early Stuarts 171
 7 Coffee and my Lord Lumley's pease-porage: war and peace in the Seventeenth century 201
 8 Roast beef and sweet oranges: the late Stuarts 231
 9 Turtle soup and plum pudding: the Georgian age 255
 10 Roast hare and Indian curry: the era of Hannah Glasse 293
 11 Pheasant consommé and forced peas: rich eating in the nineteenth century 315
 12 Brown Windsor soup and high tea: The world of the Victorians 343
 13 Omelette Arnold Bennett and bully beef: From the Edwardians to the eve of war 381
 14 Spam and coronation chicken: The Second World War and the years of austerity 417
 15 Prawn cocktail and pizza: Modern English food 445
 Appendix of historical recipes 466

Editions

Reception

A History of English Food was described by The Independent as "richly informative" and "surely destined for classic status". The reviewer noted that she had seen badger hams on the bar in the West Country pubs of her childhood, and that a tripe seller in Dewsbury market sold "nine different varieties of tripe, including penis and udder (which is remarkably like pease pudding)."

Jane Shilling, writing in The Telegraph, calls the book "magnificently eccentric and robustly informative", admitting that it is mainly digression, "from Victorian fruit-growing via Rudyard Kipling’s poem “The Glory of the Garden” to her theory that Kipling was never made Poet Laureate because Queen Victoria objected to his lines about “the Widow at Windsor/With a hairy gold crown on ’er ’ead”. Shilling finds this "an impressive tour" from a well-stocked mind, her approach being "a firmly chronological line across the landscape of culinary history, pausing at intervals to examine objects of interest." She agrees that the book is " opinionated and wildly idiosyncratic", in the tradition of W.N.W. Fowler's "gin-soaked" Countryman's Cooking and Rupert Croft-Cooke's English Cooking: A New Approach. The book gives, Shilling asserts, a "glorious sense of the continuity of English cuisine from the Middle Ages to the present", making it an "engaging, funny and admirably entertaining history."

Fay Maschler, writing in The Spectator, calls the book a "less stringent, more capricious, generously illustrated account" which gives "a magical sense of almost having been there at every twist and turn, such is her passion for livestock, animal husbandry and cultivation of the edible." There are few "revelations, although plenty of engaging detail. There are too many suppositions and fancies." But she feels that Dickson Wright brings the book to life when she speaks from knowledge to compare " because she has eaten them, the taste of swan, moorhen and rook, praise the unexpectedly white meat of beaver tail and draw on a childhood .. when local sturgeon were for sale, rough boys sold live eels along Hammersmith Mall".

Rachel Cooke, reviewing A History of English Food for The Guardian, writes that she feels "pretty cross. All of the information in this book can be found elsewhere, and much better done, too." She compares the book unfavourably with Kate Colquhoun's 2008 Taste: The Story of Britain Through Its Cooking and Dorothy Hartley's 1954 "classic" Food in England. Cooke argues that Dickson Wright is "as particular as she is greedy", and "gruesomely snobbish", out of touch with "Other people", preferring therefore the overindulgent Georgians who could afford a suitable retinue of servants.

British Food in America describes the book as "a stinker", substituting "speculation and snobbish reminiscence for any modicum of research or analysis."

References

2011 non-fiction books
English cuisine
History books about England
Random House books